Loomis is an unincorporated community located in the town of Lake, Marinette County, Wisconsin, United States.

Geography

It is connected by road to Crivitz (County Highway W) to the west, Lake Noquebay (via County Highway GG) to the north, Walsh (via County Highway G) to the east, and Porterfield (via County Highway E) to the southeast.

History
A post office formerly operated in Loomis, but was shut down in 1933. In 1911 a grocery store was established by Joseph Schroeder (1885–1931), an early settler who also served as postmaster, and soon afterward a cheese factory was started by Bonaventura Cubalchini (1885–1948). In 1915, the railroad removed the station agent at Loomis due to the low volume of traffic there, and the depot was removed by the 1970s. The local school in Loomis closed in the 1980s.

References

External links

Unincorporated communities in Marinette County, Wisconsin
Unincorporated communities in Wisconsin